Italian Haitians are Haitians of Italian descent or Italians with Haitian citizenship.

History

During colonial times only a few italians went to Haiti: most of them were catholic missionaries, with a few merchants and soldiers.

The business sector of Haiti, was controlled by German and Italian immigrants in the mid-19th century. In 1908 there were 160 Italians residing in Haiti, according to the Italian consul De Matteis, of whom 128 lived in the capital Port-au-Prince. 

During the 2010 earthquake in Port-au-Prince, the first Italian recorded dead was 70-year-old Gigliola Martino, who was born in Haiti to Italian parents who emigrated to the country in the early 20th century.

Daphnée Duplaix, an American actress and model born in New York City, is of Haitian and Italian descent.
 
Stella Jean is a fashion designer in Italy whose mother is Haitian and father is Italian.
 
In 2011, according to the Italian census, there were 134 Italians who were resident in Haiti, nearly all of them living in the capital. However, there were nearly 5,000 Haitians with recent & distant italians roots (according to the Italian embassy).

References

Links
Hossary, Nagia (Archive article)

Bibliography
 Commissariato dellemigrazione. Emigrazione e colonie, Volume 3: Raccolta di rapporti dei RR. agenti diplomatici e consolari.Tipografia nazionale di G. Bertero & comp. Roma, 1908

Ethnic groups in Haiti
European Haitian
Haiti